Savoy Brown (originally Savoy Brown Blues Band) were an English blues rock band formed in Battersea, south west London, in 1965. Part of the late 1960s blues rock movement, Savoy Brown primarily achieved success in the United States, where they promoted their albums with non-stop touring. Founder, guitarist and primary songwriter Kim Simmonds was the sole constant member of the band from its formation in 1965 until his death in 2022.

Career
The band was formed by guitarist Kim Simmonds and harmonica player John O'Leary, following a chance meeting at Transat Imports record shop in Lisle Street, Soho, in 1965.  In naming themselves, the group put together two words that conveyed an interesting balance of opposite sentiments and approaches. The word "Savoy" came from an American blues label, Savoy Records, as the members of the band thought the word "Savoy" sounded elegant. They added “Brown” because they thought it was an extremely plain word. Overall,  the group called itself the Savoy Brown Blues Band to tell listeners that they played Chicago Blues-sounding music.

The original line-up included singer Brice Portius, keyboardist Trevor Jeavons, bassist Ray Chappell, drummer Leo Manning and harmonica player John O'Leary (O'Leary appeared on record with the band on its initial recordings for Mike Vernon's Purdah label).  Portius was one of the first black blues musicians to be a part of a British rock band. Jeavons was replaced by Bob Hall shortly after the band's formation and the arrival of Martin Stone on guitars. Not long after Stone's arrival, O'Leary left the band as a consequence of a dispute with Manager Harry Simmonds. This line-up, sans O'Leary, appeared on the band's 1967 debut album, Shake Down, a collection of blues covers.

Further line-up changes ensued, with founding members Portius, Chappell and Manning departing along with recently recruited guitarist Stone over a short period of time. Chris Youlden and "Lonesome" Dave Peverett would become the band's new vocalist and 2nd guitarist respectively. Initially Bob Brunning and Hughie Flint (from John Mayall's Clapton-version Bluesbreakers) filled the bassist and drummer positions on the single "Taste and Try (Before You Buy)," but they were subsequently replaced by Rivers Jobe and Bill Bruford. Within a fortnight of Bruford's arrival in the band, he had been replaced by Roger Earl (Bruford went on to huge success later as Yes's drummer). This line-up recorded two albums in 1968, Getting to the Point, and Blue Matter, which demonstrated Youlden's rise as a songwriter alongside Simmonds. It was this line-up that released the single "Train to Nowhere" in 1969. A Step Further was released later that year, and introduced bassist Tony Stevens replacing Jobe. They developed a loyal core following in the United States, due to songs such as "I'm Tired," a driving, melodic song from the album.

Following the release of Raw Sienna (also released in 1969) Youlden departed the band. Raw Sienna had marked the first time that a single line-up of the band had recorded successive albums without any changes in personnel. The band recorded their next album, 1970's Looking In, as a four-piece, and following this album Peverett, Stevens, and Earl left to form Foghat with guitarist Rod Price.

Simmonds continued the band with Dave Walker on vocals, Paul Raymond on keyboards and guitars, Andy Silvester on bass, and Dave Bidwell on drums – almost the complete Chicken Shack line up.

They were one of the bands that UK Decca (US London/Parrot) stuck with through the lean times until they started selling records; it took four or five albums until they started to sell in the US. In the late 1960s and 1970s, the band managed to break into the Billboard Hot 100. The 1971 release Street Corner Talking  included the songs "Tell Mama" and "Street Corner Talking". Superstardom perpetually evaded them, though, perhaps in part because of their frequent line-up changes. Despite that their next album, Hellbound Train (1972) was a Top 40 album for them in the US. In January 1974, the British music magazine, NME reported that Stan Webb was joining Savoy Brown, following the break-up of Chicken Shack.
 
In the late 1970s, Simmonds organised the band with singer Ralph Morman, formerly of the Joe Perry Project, drummer Keith Boyce and guitarist Barry Paul of Heavy Metal Kids fame, and bassist John Humphrey. This line-up recorded the 1981 Rock 'N' Roll Warriors album, which gave Savoy Brown more success than the group had seen since the mid-1970s. The single "Run to Me", a cover of a song originally recorded by Smokie, became Savoy's highest-charting single in the United States, peaking at number 68 on the Billboard Hot 100 on the week of 31 October 1981. That year found the band performing several major arena shows in the US alongside Judas Priest, and recording a live album at the Rainbow Music Hall in Denver. Greatest Hits – Live in Concert was released at the end of the year, featuring "Run to Me" as the sole studio track, as the single had appeared previously only on the German version of Rock 'N' Roll Warriors. Despite the success of this line-up, Simmonds was once again on his own by the Spring of 1982.

Singer Dave Walker returned to the group in the late 1980s and recorded two studio albums and one live album as lead vocalist, but left the group for a second time in 1991. All three of these projects featuring Walker were well received by longtime fans. During the 1990s Simmonds continued working with various line-ups of the band, including a brief stint with future Molly Hatchet lead singer Phil McCormack.

During the band's active years, they toured the world and recorded regularly, with only Simmonds since its beginning. Original member and harmonica player John O'Leary is still active on the British blues circuit with his band Sugarkane. After leaving Savoy Brown for the first time in the 1970s singer Dave Walker joined Fleetwood Mac for one album, and in early 1978 became the temporary lead singer for Black Sabbath. Bassists have included: Andy Pyle, who played with Mick Abrahams from Jethro Tull in Blodwyn Pig, then later with The Kinks; John Humphrey, who would go on to work with many major artists, including Carole King; Gary Moore; and Andy Silvester, who played with Wha-Koo after Chicken Shack.  Savoy Brown also provided an outlet for keyboardist and guitarist Paul Raymond, who later went on to join UFO. Drummer Keith Boyce reformed Heavy Metal Kids and is currently active with that group. Singer Ralph Morman disappeared from the scene in the mid-1980s until emerging in 2011 with plans for a solo project. Guitarist Barry Paul became a successful studio owner in Los Angeles. Singer Jimmy Kunes, who fronted the band during the mid-1980s, is currently the singer for the reformed supergroup Cactus.

Savoy Brown contributed the song "A Man Alone" for the soundtrack to the movie Kickboxer 2.

In 2008, "Train to Nowhere" was used, and figured as a clue, in the TV series CSI: NY, in Season 4, Episode 10 – "The Thing About Heroes".

Their first album for Blind Pig Records, Strange Days, was released in 2003. The band released another record, Steel, in 2007.

Their album, Voodoo Moon, was released by Ruf Records in 2011.

In 2015, billed as Kim Simmonds and Savoy Brown, their album, The Devil to Pay, reached number four on the US Billboard Top Blues Albums chart.

Members

Discography

Albums 
Shake Down – 1967 (not issued in the US until CD release in 1990)
Getting to the Point – 1968
Blue Matter – 1969 – US No. 182
A Step Further – 1969 – US No. 71
Raw Sienna – 1970 – US No. 121; CAN No. 75
Looking In – 1970 – UK No. 50; US No. 39, AUS No. 25, CAN No. 58
Street Corner Talking – 1971 – US No. 75; CAN No. 47
Hellbound Train – 1972 – US No. 34; CAN N0. 40
Lion's Share – 1972 – US No. 151
Jack the Toad – 1973 – US No. 84
Boogie Brothers – 1974 – US No. 101; CAN No. 95
Wire Fire – 1975 – US No. 153  
Skin 'n' Bone – 1976 – US No. 206
Savage Return – 1978 – US No. 208
Rock 'n' Roll Warriors – 1981 – US No. 185
Greatest Hits Live in Concert – 1981
Just Live (recorded 1970) – 1981
Live in Central Park (recorded 1972) – 1985 (Relix RRLP-2014)
Slow Train (An Album of Acoustic Music) – 1986 (Relix RRLP-2023)
Make Me Sweat – 1988
Kings of Boogie – 1989
Live and Kickin''' – 1990Let It Ride – 1992Bring It Home – 1994 (billed as 'Savoy Brown/Kim Simmonds')Live at the Record Plant (recorded 1975) – 1998The Bottom Line Encore Collection (live, recorded 1981) – 1999The Blues Keep Me Holding On – 1999Looking from the Outside: Live '69/'70 – 2000Jack the Toad: Live '70/'72 – 2000Hellbound Train: Live 1969-1972 – 2003Strange Dreams – 2003You Should Have Been There! (live, recorded 23 February 2003) – 2004Steel – 2007Too Much of a Good Thing – 2009Voodoo Moon – 2011Songs from the Road – 2013Goin' to the Delta – 2014 (billed as 'Kim Simmonds and Savoy Brown')Still Live After 50 Years, Volume 1 − 2015The Devil to Pay – 2015 (billed as 'Kim Simmonds and Savoy Brown')Still Live After 50 Years, Volume 2 − 2017Witchy Feelin'  – 2017City Night – 2019Ain't Done Yet – 2020Taking the Blues Back Home: Live in America – 2020Blues All Around'' – 2023

Selected singles 
 "I'm Tired" (1969) – US No. 74; CAN No. 51
 "Tell Mama" (1971) – US No. 83 
 "Run to Me" (1981) – US No. 68

References

External links

Savoy Brown website

 
 
John O'Leary & Sugarkane
Illustrated Chris Youlden discography

1965 establishments in England
Musical groups from London
English blues rock musical groups
English hard rock musical groups
British rhythm and blues boom musicians
English psychedelic rock music groups
Musical groups established in 1965
Decca Records artists
Deram Records artists
Parrot Records artists
Blind Pig Records artists
Relix Records artists